Mattias Hargin (born 7 October 1985) is a Swedish former World Cup alpine ski racer. Born in Stockholm, he competed mainly in slalom, and is the younger brother of Janette Hargin (b. 1977), who also raced for Sweden. Hargin was married to Swedish alpine free-skier Matilda Rapaport, who died in an avalanche in Chile in July 2016.

He finished fifth in the slalom at the 2009 World Championships and competed for Sweden at the 2010 Winter Olympics in the slalom, finishing in 14th place.

In January 2011, Hargin made a strong comeback in a World Cup slalom in Zagreb to finish third. He was the last qualifier at 30th after the first run, but had the best time in the second run to attain his first World Cup podium. Hargin was runner-up in a World Cup slalom at Val-d'Isère in December 2013. His one and only World Cup win came in January 2015 at Kitzbühel.

He announced his retirement from alpine skiing on 12 March 2019.

World Cup results

Season standings

Standings through 30 January 2018

Race podiums
 1 win – (1 SL) 
 7 podiums – (6 SL, 1 PSL)

World Championship results

Olympic results

References

External links

Mattias Hargin World Cup standings at the International Ski Federation

Mattias Hargin at Atomic Skis
Mattias Hargin at the Swedish Olympic Committee (SOK) 
 

1985 births
Swedish male alpine skiers
Alpine skiers at the 2010 Winter Olympics
Alpine skiers at the 2014 Winter Olympics
Alpine skiers at the 2018 Winter Olympics
Olympic alpine skiers of Sweden
Sportspeople from Stockholm
Living people